Torric Jebrin (born 14 January 1991) is a Ghanaian footballer who plays as an attacking midfielder, recently he is free player

Club career

Portsmouth
He began his career at Hearts of Oak. On 3 November 2008 it was announced, that Jebrin had signed a three-year contract with English club Portsmouth FC, collaboration club of Hearts of Oak. Jebrin had been on several trials at the club, and during that, he was watched by Arsenal during a match. Also Chelsea, Atlético Madrid, Lyon and Inter Milan were all keen to have the player on trials, but his management did not want to masquerade the player at various club trials.

Hearts and Portsmouth FC agreed and signed papers in the matter of Jebrin transferring to Portsmouth FC via a club in Belgium from the 1st January 2009. Jebrin was entered in an educational program in Belgium and also in England, fully paid for by Portsmouth. The plan was to loan him out to a Belgian club and was later loaned out to S.V. Zulte Waregem.

Turkey
In January 2011, Jebrin signed a two and half year deal with Turkish side Bucaspor. He played for the club 26 times, scoring three goals.

In December 2011, Jebrin completed a controversial move to Trabzonspor on a free transfer after terminating his contract with Bucaspor a month earlier without justification. Bucaspor released a statement that Trabzonspor enticed the footballer in violation of transfer regulations and Bucaspor's legal board had filed a complaint with the Turkish Football Federation demanding Trabzonspor receive a transfer ban for their actions.

Ismaily SC 
In 31 July Ismaily SC in Egypt announcement on sign a contract with Jebrin for 3 years on free transfer. Jebrin said that he is very happy to sign a contract with a very big club in Africa and in Arab region and Egypt.

TP Mazembe 
In July 2019, Jebrin signed for Congolese team TP Mazembe on a 2-year contract. Despite a successful first match against OC Bukavu Dawa, in which he scored a goal and made two assists, his contract was cut short due to poor performance and he left the club in August 2020.

New Radiant S.C. 
In July 2022, Maldivian club New Radiant S.C. announced that Jebrin would be part of their squad as the team made their comeback in the 2nd Division of the Maldivian League after 4 years of suspension sanctioned by FIFA was lifted. On the 16th of July, New Radiant S.C. unveiled Jebrin as one of their vice-captains. Jebrin scored against Club Teenage in his first match as a New Radiant S.C. Player. He bettered his performance in the next match by scoring a hat-trick within the first half against Lorenzo SC.

International career 
He has played for the local national team for home based players and débuted at the age of just 15 against Niger in April 2008, attempting to qualify for the first edition of the African Nations Championship, the new competition for home based African players.

References

External links
Profile at TFF
Torric Jebrin at Footballdatabase

1991 births
Living people
Association football midfielders
Ghanaian footballers
Ghanaian expatriate footballers
Footballers from Accra
Accra Hearts of Oak S.C. players
Portsmouth F.C. players
S.V. Zulte Waregem players
1461 Trabzon footballers
Bucaspor footballers
Trabzonspor footballers
Al-Wehda Club (Mecca) players
Al-Kawkab FC players
Ismaily SC players
Al Mokawloon Al Arab SC players
Al Masry SC players
TP Mazembe players
Al-Arabi SC (Saudi Arabia) players
Süper Lig players
TFF First League players
Saudi Professional League players
Egyptian Premier League players
Saudi First Division League players
Saudi Second Division players
Linafoot players
Ghanaian expatriate sportspeople in England
Ghanaian expatriate sportspeople in Belgium
Ghanaian expatriate sportspeople in Turkey
Ghanaian expatriate sportspeople in Egypt
Ghanaian expatriate sportspeople in Saudi Arabia
Ghanaian expatriate sportspeople in the Democratic Republic of the Congo
Expatriate footballers in England
Expatriate footballers in Belgium
Expatriate footballers in Turkey
Expatriate footballers in Egypt
Expatriate footballers in Saudi Arabia
Expatriate footballers in the Democratic Republic of the Congo